Auckland Prison (original name Paremoremo Prison, colloquially Pare, pronounced "Par-re") is a prison facility consisting of medium security and maximum security compounds in Paremoremo, Auckland, New Zealand. The two compounds are separate but located close together in a rural area.

The prison contains New Zealand's only specialist maximum-security unit, housing some of the most severe criminals in the country. Its old names of 'Paremoremo' and 'Pare' are still well-known and used throughout New Zealand.

Organisation

Facilities

Auckland Prison has beds for 680 prisoners. It includes the medium-security Auckland West division, built in 1981 to relieve crowding at other institutions, particularly at Mount Eden Prison; a minimum security work and pre-release unit called Te Mahinga; and a 60-bed special treatment unit for child sex offenders, called Te Piriti.

Within the maximum security prison, the section formerly called 'D Block' has a harsh reputation. Conditions in it are very restrictive, and there are around three prison officers per inmate of the block.

Security

Security was upgraded significantly in the 1990s and 2000s. David Connor, the prison chaplain, noted that when he moved to Paremoremo in 1984, a chain-link fence around the medium-security block was all that was required. In 2010, however, the maximum security part of the prison, East Division, is surrounded by a highly secure perimeter fence covered in razor wire. Razor wire is also laid between the unit and the fence. East Wing has only one point of entry which has a highly sensitive scanner that every person must pass through.

Anyone carrying items into East Division is required to bring them through in a clear plastic bag. Every person entering is also liable to be searched. East Division has a centralised CCTV system, with cameras monitored from the control room in the centre of the wing at all times. All cells are made of solid concrete and have bars on the windows. All exercise yards are enclosed. There is also a higher staff/prisoner ratio in east block than in other units.

West Division accommodates high-medium security prisoners. Like East Wing, it has only one point of entry and any person entering the unit is liable to be searched. There are also CCTV cameras monitored from the guardroom, and sensors between the fences of the West Division.

There is also one minimum security unit, one low-medium security unit and the Te Piriti unit, which houses low security prisoners. These units have a lower level of security as prisoners in these units are deemed to be a minimal risk to public safety.

In case of a serious incident, guards have few options but to call the police. Corrections officers have repeatedly warned that violent inmates are becoming more of a problem (in Paremoremo and the New Zealand corrections system in general).

After a serious attack by inmates on a prison guard in July 2007, a member of the staff anonymously complained to The New Zealand Herald about security procedures being inadequate, and said the prison was more like a 'holiday camp' for prisoners - especially in the case of those considered especially dangerous, alleging that prison management gives in to most of their demands to keep the peace.

Notable inmates

 Brian Curtis was an inmate after being convicted of importing $1.5 million of LSD in 1991, until his escape in August 1993, and again after his recapture in 2001 until his release on parole in December 2007. Convicted murderer Michael Bullock escaped with Curtis and was recaptured in 1999.
 Dean Wickliffe has escaped from Auckland Prison twice.
 Triple murderer William Bell was being held in the maximum security Delta Block in 2007. 
 George Charlie Baker, who killed a teenage boy in a prison van, is a prisoner. 
 Convicted murderer Antonie Dixon was being held in the maximum security area, awaiting sentencing, when he died in February 2009. 
 Bruce Howse, who killed his step-daughters, was held in the maximum security area before he was transferred to Whanganui Prison for beating up Joseph Thompson in May 2005. 
 Graeme Burton was found guilty in November 2009 of the attempted murder of Dwayne Marsh at Auckland Prison and was sentenced to the indefinite term of preventive detention. 
 Jason Somerville, who was convicted of a double murder in Christchurch in 2009, was once a prisoner in the maximum security area. 
 Scott Watson, who was convicted of a double murder at Furneaux Lodge in the Marlborough Sounds on 1 January 1998, was once a prisoner in the maximum security area before he was transferred to Christchurch Men's Prison. 
 Convicted rapist and murderer Hayden Taylor was once a prisoner in the maximum security area before he was transferred to Rimutaka Prison.
 Brenton Harrison Tarrant the Christchurch mosque shooter is held in isolation in the maximum security area
 Cop killer Daniel Luff was once a prisoner in the maximum security area
 Paul Wood, author, motivational speaker, life coach, and psychologist

See also
List of prisons in New Zealand

References

External links
Auckland Prison, Department of Corrections

Prisons in New Zealand
Buildings and structures in Auckland
North Shore, New Zealand